Haswell Wilson (13 May 1884 – 28 February 1951) was a British athlete. He competed in the men's high jump at the 1908 Summer Olympics.

References

1884 births
1951 deaths
Athletes (track and field) at the 1908 Summer Olympics
British male high jumpers
Olympic athletes of Great Britain
Place of birth missing
Olympic male high jumpers